The men's 3000 metres at the 2012 IAAF World Indoor Championships took place March 9 and 10 at the Ataköy Athletics Arena.

Medalists

Records

Qualification standards

Schedule

Results

Heats

Qualification: First 4 of each heat (Q) plus the 4 fastest qualified (q).

Final
9 athletes from 7 countries participated. The final started at 15:10.

References

3000 metres
3000 metres at the World Athletics Indoor Championships